Martin P. Heffernan (1944 – 22 February 2021) was an Irish Gaelic footballer and Gaelic games administrator. At club level he lined out with Tullamore and was a member of the Offaly senior football team during the 1966-67 National League. Heffernan also served for several years as Offaly Bord na nÓg Secretary.

Honours

Tullamore
Offaly Senior Football Championship: 1973

References

1944 births
2021 deaths
Gaelic games administrators
Offaly inter-county Gaelic footballers
Tullamore Gaelic footballers